Gabriela Cámara is a Mexican chef, restaurant owner, and author. Born in Chihuahua City, Cámara grew up in Tepoztlán. In 1998, Cámara opened Contramar, a restaurant specializing in seafood, in Mexico City. She opened the restaurant Cala in San Francisco in 2015. Cámara holds ownership in Mexico City restaurants Capicúa, Barricuda Diner, and MeroToro. Her cookbook, My Mexico City Kitchen, was published in 2019, the year Cámara was appointed to the Mexican government's Council of Cultural Diplomacy and as an advisor to President Andrés Manuel López Obrador.

Cámara has twice been a James Beard Foundation award semifinalist, in 2017 and 2019. In 2019, Cámara, her two restaurants, and their staff members were the subject of a Netflix documentary, A Tale of Two Kitchens. She also has a Masterclass course in which she teaches viewers how to cook Mexican food.

Cámara was included in Time's Most Influential People in 2020. Gabriela Cámara became one of the five new Iron Chefs in the American Netflix reboot Iron Chef: Quest for an Iron Legend of the Iron Chef and Iron Chef America cooking shows.

References 

Living people
Mexican chefs
21st-century Mexican women
Year of birth missing (living people)
Women chefs
Universidad Iberoamericana alumni
People from Chihuahua City
Women restaurateurs
Mexican restaurateurs